Keretsa brutoni is a fossil bilaterian from the Late Precambrian-aged Zimnie Gory Formation near Arkhangelsk Oblast, Russia, along the Winter coast of the White Sea.  The first specimens were found in 2005.  This rounded oblong-shaped organism resembles Naraoia, in having its body divided into an anteriorly positioned headshield, and a trunkshield.  A pair of antennae-like structures emanate from underneath the base of the headshield, and there are numerous oblique grooves along the trunkshield that suggest legs.

References

Enigmatic animal taxa
White Sea fossils
Ediacaran life
Controversial taxa
Fossil taxa described in 2017